The White Cloud Temple, also known as Baiyun Temple or the Abbey or Monastery of the White Clouds, is a Taoist temple and monastery located in Beijing, China. It is one of "The Three Great Ancestral Courts" of the Quanzhen School of Taoism and is titled "The First Temple under Heaven".

History
The White Cloud Temple was first founded in the mid-8th century during the Tang dynasty and was initially called the Temple of Heavenly Perpetuity (Tianchang Guan). During this period, the abbey was state-sponsored and staffed by an elite clergy. From 1125 to 1215 when what is now Beijing was controlled by the Jin dynasty, the abbey served as the Taoist administrative headquarters and played an important role in state ceremonies. After Beijing was taken by the Mongols in 1215, the abbey was taken over by the Quanzhen patriarch Qiu Chuji and became the headquarters of the Quanzhen movement until the establishment of the Ming dynasty. Qiuwho himself was known by the name Master of Eternal Springrenamed the abbey the Palace of Eternal Spring (Changchun Gong). Upon being summoned by Genghis Khan, Qiu undertook a three-year trek from Shandong to give the great khan an exposition on Taoism, which he completed in October 1222.  Qiu's successor, Yin Zhiping (1169-1251) built a memorial shrine over Qiu's grave. This shrine became a temple in its own right and became known as the White Cloud Temple. The abbey was damaged when the Mongols took over in the late 13th century and, during the Ming dynasty, the Palace of Eternal Spring was destroyed. However, the White Cloud Temple survived and took over the functions of its former parent. Under the Ming, clergy from the Zhengyi school took over operations of the abbey but continued Quanzhen traditions and ordination ceremonies. Zhengyi control over the temple continued until the 17th century, when their monopoly ended and the Quanzhen master Wang Changyue (d.1680) took over. To this day, the White Cloud Temple remains controlled by the Quanzhen school. The abbey was without an abbot for the 1940s and was closed when the communists came to power in 1949. Unlike many other historical sites which were being destroyed during the Cultural Revolution, the White Cloud Temple managed to survived but was also damaged. Today, it is again a fully functioning temple and is the seat of the Chinese Taoist Association.

Layout
Like most other Chinese temples, the White Cloud Temple is laid out on a north-south axis, with the entrance at the south end. There are five main halls built upon the main axis, beginning with the Main Gate, Yuhuang Hall , "Hall of the Jade Emperor"), Laolü Hall ), Qiuzu Hall ("Hall of the Venerable Qiu"), and finally the Sanqing Hall , "Hall of the Three Pure Ones").  On either side of the main axis are two smaller axes, each containing halls dedicated to a variety of deities. In the rear of the complex is a garden which hosts the abbey’s ordination platform.

Yuhuang Hall
This hall was first built in 1661 and was rebuilt in 1788. It is dedicated to the Jade Emperor, who oversees the Celestial Bureaucracy in Chinese religion. It is three bays long with a gabled roof, and is flanked by drum and bell towers.

Laolü Hall
This hall has the same design as the Yuhuang Hall and was first built in 1456. The monastic community holds a twice-daily office in the Laolü Hall, and it is where ordination certificates are issued.

Qiuzu Hall
Originally built to enshrine Qiu Chuji, this hall was first built in 1228. It is three bays long with a front gallery.

Sanqing Hall
In 1428, the Sanqing hall was built. It is a two-story, five bay structure with a gabled roof that contains statues of the Three Pure Ones on the top floor and the Four Celestial Aides on the bottom floor.

Ordinations

Out of 20 Quanzhen ordination seminaries in the Qing dynasty, the White Cloud Temple was the most important of all. In order to become a Taoist monk of Quanzhen Order, novices first had to spend three years living in a temple. After accomplishing this, they were eligible to be ordained. The ordination was extremely harsh. Each novice had to undergo 100 days of brutal training that sometimes resulted in death. In modern times, this has been reduced to 53 days and is no longer as dangerous. After this training period, novices had exams on Taoist classics, poetry, and precepts. Afterwards, successful novices were fully ordained as Taoist monks. During the Qing dynasty, an average of 200 novices were ordained every four years. Ordination ceremonies ended after 1927, but were resumed in 1989.

Festivals
Every year on the 19th day of the first lunar month a festival is held at the abbey in celebration of Qiu Chuji's birthday. It has been thought that Qiu would return to earth as an immortal on this day. The festival was first held during the Yuan dynasty, but was suspended after the People's Republic of China was established in 1949. The festival was revived in the 1990s and continues to be held to this day.

Gallery

See also

 Taoism & Taoist Canon
 Master Changchun
 Quanzhen School
 Dragon Gate Taoism
 History of Taoism 
 Taoist schools
 Chinese Taoist Association

References

Citations

Bibliography

Goossaert, Vincent. "Baiyun Guan." in Fabrizio Pregadio, ed., The Encyclopedia of Taoism (London: Routledge, 2008), 207-210.
Lai-Chi Tim. "Daoism in China Today: 1980-2002." The China Quarterly, 174(2003):413-427.
Qian Yun. Taoist Buildings: Ancient Chinese Architecture. Springer, 2000.

Religious buildings and structures completed in 1228
Major National Historical and Cultural Sites in Beijing
Taoist temples in Beijing
Buildings and structures in Fengtai District
13th-century Taoist temples